Spodnja Luša is a settlement in the Municipality of Škofja Loka in the Upper Carniola region of Slovenia.

Notable people
Notable people that were born or lived in Spodnja Luša include:
Lovrenc Košir (1804–1879), civil servant and postage stamp pioneer

References

External links

Spodnja Luša at Geopedia

Populated places in the Municipality of Škofja Loka